Olbramkostel is a market town in Znojmo District in the South Moravian Region of the Czech Republic. It has about 500 inhabitants.

Notable people
Anna Mifková (born 1943), volleyball player

References

Populated places in Znojmo District
Market towns in the Czech Republic